Onni Tommila (born 18 July 1999) is a Finnish actor, known for the films Last Cowboy Standing (2009), Rare Exports: A Christmas Tale (2010) and Big Game (2014). Tommila also appeared in the 2005 . He was also the voice of Eetu in the animated film  (2011).

He is the son of actor  and scenic designer Ida Helander-Tommila. Director Jalmari Helander is his maternal uncle, and is said to have had Onni in mind for the leading role in Big Game while he was devising the film.

References

External links
 

Living people 
21st-century Finnish male actors                     
Finnish male child actors
Finnish child actors
Finnish male film actors
1999 births